Neil McManus (born 1988) is an Irish hurler who plays as a centre-forward for the Antrim senior team.

Born in Cushendall, County Antrim, McManus first played competitive hurling during his school days at St MacNissi's College. He arrived on the inter-county scene at the age of seventeen when he first linked up with the Antrim minor team, before later lining out with the under-21 side. He made his senior debut in the 2007 championship. McManus has been a key member of the team since then, and has won five Ulster medals and one Walsh Cup medal.

McManus has represented the Ulster inter-provincial team on a number of occasions. At club level he is a two-time Ulster medallist with Ruairí Óg. He has also won three championship medals. Notoriously associated with Gnasher McLongtooth embroiled in a scandal where McLongtooth fielded McManus in an under 14 camogie game.

Playing career

Club

McManus plays his club hurling with the Cushendall Ruairí Óg club and has enjoyed much success.  After a promising under-age career he made his senior debut as a seventeen-year-old in 2005.  That year he won his first senior county championship.

Cushendall made it two-in-a-row in 2006 with McManus later collecting an Ulster club title.

After surrendering their county and provincial titles in 2007, Cushendall returned in 2008 with McMaus winning a third county title following another win over Loughgiel Shamrocks.  He later secured a second Ulster club title following a win over Ballygalget.

Inter-county

McManus first came to prominence on the inter-county scene as a member of the Antrim minor hurling team.  With the 'young saffrons' he won three Ulster titles in succession in 2004, 2005 and as captain in 2006.  He subsequently joined the Antrim under-21 hurling team, winning his first Ulster title while still a minor in 2006.  He won a second Ulster under-21 title in 2009.

McManus made his senior debut in 2007 in a National Hurling League game against Dublin.  Later that year he made his championship debut in the provincial decider.  A 2-24 to 0-4 trouncing of Down gave McManus his first Ulster title.

In 2008 McManus missed the later stages of the National League and the entire championship campaign due to injury.  He returned in 2009 and has become Antrim's top score-getters.

Inter-provincial

McManus has also lined out with Ulster in the inter-provincial series of games.

Career statistics

Club

Inter-county

Honours

Team

Ruairí Óg
Ulster Senior Club Hurling Championship (2): 2006, 2008
Antrim Senior Hurling Championship (3): 2005, 2006, 2008, 2018

Antrim
National League Division 2A (1): 2020
Joe McDonagh Cup (1): 2020
Ulster Senior Hurling Championship (5): 2007, 2009, 2010, 2012, 2013
Walsh Cup (1): 2008
Ulster Under-21 Hurling Championship (2): 2006, 2009
Ulster Minor Hurling Championship (2): 2005, 2006

Individual

Honours
Ulster Colleges Hurling All-Stars (2): 2004, 2006

References

1989 births
Living people
Ruairi Og Cushendall hurlers
Antrim inter-county hurlers
Ulster inter-provincial hurlers